In Incan and pre-Incan mythology, Pariacaca was a god of water and rainstorms and a creator god. He was born a falcon, but later became human.

Inca gods
Creator gods
Rain deities
Water gods
Mythological birds of prey